Leroy Jevon Carter (born September 14, 1995) is an American professional basketball player for the Milwaukee Bucks of the National Basketball Association (NBA). He played college basketball for the West Virginia Mountaineers. A point guard for the Mountaineers, Carter was known as one of the top defensive players in college basketball, winning the NABC Defensive Player of the Year and the Lefty Driesell Award after both his junior and senior seasons, and winning the inaugural Naismith Defensive Player of the Year in his final season.

High school career
Carter played basketball at Proviso East High School in Maywood, Illinois. He played mostly off the ball in high school. From 2011 to 2012 he played for Team NLP in AAU competition, where one of his teammates was Jalen Brunson. Carter was a three-star recruit and was the No. 299 player in the 2014 class according to 247Sports.com. He received scholarship offers from Akron, Dartmouth, Kent State, Lehigh, Toledo, Valparaiso, UW-Green Bay and Illinois State, but committed to West Virginia.

College career
He converted to the point guard position at West Virginia, making his name as one of the top defensive players in the Big 12 Conference. He was one of the architects of "Press Virginia", coach Bob Huggins's defensive scheme that forces many turnovers.  Carter became a starter as a sophomore and averaged 9.5 points and 2.3 rebounds per game.

In Carter's junior season in 2016–17, he averaged 13.5 points, 5.0 rebounds and 3.6 assists per game. He received many accolades for his defensive prowess, earning Big 12 Defensive Player of the Year, as well as the Lefty Driesell Award and the NABC Defensive Player of the Year as the top defensive player in the country. Following his junior season, Carter declared for the 2017 NBA draft, but did not hire an agent. Ultimately he decided to return to the Mountaineers for his senior season.

Before the start of the 2017–18 season, Carter was unanimously named to the preseason All-Big 12 team. On November 30, 2017, Carter became WVU's all-time leader in steals, surpassing Greg Jones’ mark of 252 in a win over NJIT. On March 3, 2018 against Iowa State, he became the first major conference player to reach 1500 points, 500 rebounds, 500 assists and 300 steals in a career.

On March 12, 2018, Carter was named Academic All-American of the Year for Division I men's basketball.

For the 2017–18 season, Carter was named a second-team All-American by the Associated Press. He was also named to the Sporting News second team, and the National Association of Basketball Coaches (NABC)  third team, resulting in consensus second-team All-America honors. Later that same week, he was added to the 2018 John R. Wooden Award All American Team. He was also named the 2018 Senior CLASS Award winner. This award (Celebrating Loyalty and Achievement for Staying in School), given annually, is for the most outstanding senior student athlete in Men's Basketball. Carter is the second player in West Virginia University history to win this award, the first being Da'Sean Butler, who won it in 2010.

For his senior season, Jevon Carter won many postseason awards for his defensive play, including Big 12 Defensive Player of the Year, the NABC Defensive Player of the Year, the Lefty Driesell Player of the Year and the Naismith Defensive Player of the Year. Carter became the first player to win the Lefty Driesell Player of the Year more than once and only the 7th player to win the NABC Defensive Player of the Year more than once, the first since Hasheem Thabeet won in the 2007–08 season and the 2008–09 season. He won the inaugural Naismith Defensive Player of the Year award.

Records
 WVU career steal leader (330)
 WVU single-season steal leader (112, 2018)
 WVU single-season assist leader (246, 2018)
 Sole 4x Big 12 All-Defensive Team Member

College statistics

Professional career

Memphis Grizzlies (2018–2019)
On June 21, 2018, Carter was selected by the Memphis Grizzlies in the second round of the 2018 NBA draft with the 32nd overall pick. On July 12, 2018, the Memphis Grizzlies announced that they had officially signed with Carter. During his rookie season, he has had multiple assignments to the Memphis Hustle, the Grizzlies' G League affiliate. Carter made his NBA debut on December 15, 2018, coming off the bench in a 97–105 loss to the Houston Rockets with eleven points, two steals, a rebound and a block. On April 10, 2019, Carter scored a then-career-high 32 points along with four rebounds, two assists and a steal in a 132–117 win over the Golden State Warriors.

Phoenix Suns (2019–2021)
On July 7, 2019, the Grizzlies traded Carter to the Phoenix Suns. On August 8 in the 2020 NBA Bubble, Carter scored a season-high 20 points on 7–10 shooting, including 6–9 from the three-point line in a 119–112 win over the Miami Heat. His previous season-highs both had him scoring 15 points before the season's suspension began.

On November 21, 2020, as a restricted free agent, Carter signed a 3-year, $11.5 million contract to remain with the Suns. Carter made it to the 2021 NBA Finals, but the Suns were defeated in 6 games by the Milwaukee Bucks.

Brooklyn Nets (2021–2022)
On August 6, 2021, Carter and the draft rights to Day'Ron Sharpe were traded to the Brooklyn Nets in exchange for Landry Shamet. He was waived on February 22, 2022, when the Nets signed Goran Dragić.

Milwaukee Bucks (2022–present) 
On February 24, 2022, Carter signed with the Milwaukee Bucks. On April 1, in his first start for the Bucks, Carter scored 18 points and recorded a season-high 8 assists.

On July 6, 2022, Carter re-signed with the Bucks.
On November 9, 2022, Carter set a career high with 36 points and added 12 assists in a 136–132 double-overtime win against the Thunder.

Career statistics

NBA

Regular season

|-
| style="text-align:left;"| 
| style="text-align:left;"| Memphis
| 39 || 3 || 14.8 || .303 || .333 || .813 || 1.7 || 1.8 || .7 || .3 || 4.4
|-
| style="text-align:left;"| 
| style="text-align:left;"| Phoenix
| 58 || 2 || 16.3 || .416 || .425 || .852 || 2.0 || 1.4 || .8 || .3 || 4.9
|-
| style="text-align:left;"| 
| style="text-align:left;"| Phoenix
| 60 || 1 || 12.0 || .422 || .371 || .571 || 1.5 || 1.2 || .5 || .2 || 4.1
|-
| style="text-align:left;"| 
| style="text-align:left;"| Brooklyn
| 46 || 1 || 12.0 || .333 || .331 || .700 || 1.5 || 1.0 || .3 || .2 || 3.6
|-
| style="text-align:left;"| 
| style="text-align:left;"| Milwaukee
| 20 || 2 || 17.7 || .506 || .558 || 1.000 || 2.2 || 2.5 || .5 || .2 || 5.6
|- class="sortbottom"
| style="text-align:center;" colspan="2"| Career
| 223 || 9 || 14.1 || .386 || .383 || .810 || 1.7 || 1.4 || .6 || .2 || 4.4

Playoffs

|-
| style="text-align:left;"| 2021
| style="text-align:left;"| Phoenix
| 7 || 0 || 3.1 || .375 || .000 || .000 || .3 || .6 || .0 || .0 || .9
|-
| style="text-align:left;"| 2022
| style="text-align:left;"| Milwaukee
| 11 || 0 || 11.4 || .474 || .429 || 1.000 || 1.5 || .9 || .7 || .0 || 2.1
|- class="sortbottom"
| style="text-align:center;" colspan="2"| Career
| 18 || 0 || 8.2 || .444 || .333 || .500 || 1.0 || .8 || .4 || .0 || 1.6

Endorsements
On August 3, 2018, Carter and And1 announced via Instagram that Carter had signed to become an And1 brand ambassador.

References

External links
West Virginia Mountaineers bio
College stats @ sports-reference.com

1995 births
Living people
21st-century African-American sportspeople
African-American basketball players
All-American college men's basketball players
American men's basketball players
Basketball players from Illinois
Brooklyn Nets players
Memphis Grizzlies draft picks
Memphis Grizzlies players
Memphis Hustle players
Milwaukee Bucks players
Phoenix Suns players
Point guards
Sportspeople from Maywood, Illinois
West Virginia Mountaineers men's basketball players